"On and On" is a song recorded by American hip-hop rapper Shyheim featuring Kia Jeffries. It was released as the first single from his 1994 album, AKA the Rugged Child.

The song was a moderate hip-hop hit, charting at #89 on the Billboard Hot 100. It was released as a single in 1993, several months before the album release in April 1994.

Background
The song samples the 1987 hit Top Billin' by Audio Two and 1993's The Garden Freestyle by Big Daddy Kane, The Notorious B.I.G., 2Pac, Big Scoob, and Shyheim himself.

Samples and covers
The song is sampled in the 1996 song "Yes Yes Yo" by DJ Cam.

Charts

References

External links
Genius: On and On - Lyrics

1993 singles
1993 songs
Shyheim songs
Virgin Records singles